Nalan Ramazanoğlu (born 23 January 1980 in Istanbul, Turkey), also known as Nalan Mete Ramazanoğlu, is a Turkish professional basketball player and captain of Fenerbahçe İstanbul and currently player of national team. She is 1.87 m tall and weighs 75 kg. Her name was Nalan Mete before getting married. She also played in Galatasaray Istanbul before come back her youth level team Fenerbahçe İstanbul.

She is playing for Fenerbahçe İstanbul since 1998 in senior level. She played 45 times for Turkey national women's basketball team.

She was the team leader in free-throw average with 88.9% and second in three-point shot average with 39.2% (after Nicole Powell with 42.3%) in 2005–06 season.

She was member of the national team, which won gold medal at the 2005 Mediterranean Games in Almería, Spain.

Achievements with Fenerbahçe
Turkish Championship
Winners (6): 1999, 2002, 2003, 2004, 2006, 2007
Turkish Cup
Winners (7): 1999, 2000, 2001, 2004, 2005, 2006, 2007
Turkish presidents Cup
Winners (6): 1999, 2000, 2001, 2004, 2005, 2007

See also
 Turkish women in sports

External links
Player profile at fenerbahce.org

1980 births
Living people
Turkish women's basketball players
Fenerbahçe women's basketball players
Galatasaray S.K. (women's basketball) players
20th-century Turkish sportswomen
21st-century Turkish sportswomen